The 2016–17 season was Wycombe Wanderers' 130th season in existence and their 24th consecutive season in the Football League.

Competitions

Pre-season friendlies

League Two

League table

Results Summary

Matches

FA Cup

EFL Cup

EFL Trophy

Team details

Squad information

 Loan player

Appearances and goals

|-
|colspan="14"|Players who left the club before the end of the season:

|}

Transfers

In

Out

Loans in

Loans out

References

Wycombe Wanderers
Wycombe Wanderers F.C. seasons